Bertrand is a provincial electoral district in the Lanaudière and Laurentides regions of Quebec, Canada that elects members to the National Assembly of Quebec. It is not to be confused with the former, entirely different Bertrand electoral district located in the Montérégie region, which existed from 1981 to 1994; they used the same name but otherwise have nothing in common.

It was created for the 1994 election from parts of Labelle, Prévost and Rousseau. It notably includes the municipalities of Saint-Adele, Rawdon and Sainte-Agathe-des-Monts.

In the change from the 2001 to the 2011 electoral map, it lost Chertsey and Saint-Hippolyte to Rousseau electoral district and gained Prévost from Prévost electoral district, which became defunct.

In the change from the 2011 to 2017 electoral map, the riding will lose Piedmont, Prévost, Sainte-Anne-des-Lacs, Saint-Sauveur to the new riding of Prévost and will gain Chertsey and Rawdon from Rousseau.

It is named after former Union Nationale and Quebec premier Jean-Jacques Bertrand who was in power from 1968 to 1970 after the death of Daniel Johnson.

Members of the National Assembly

Election results

2014 source:

2012 source: 

|-
 
|Liberal
|Isabelle Lord
|align="right"|10,627
|align="right"|34.20
|align="right"|
|-

|-

|-
|}

|-
 
|Liberal
|Daniel Desjardins
|align="right"|9,082 
|align="right"|24.59
|align="right"|
|-

|-
|}

|-
 
|Liberal
|Michelle Monpetit
|align="right"|13,502 
|align="right"|39.79
|align="right"|

|-

|-

|-

|No Affiliation
|David Rovins
|align="right"|41
|align="right"|0.12
|align="right"|
|-
|}

|-
 
|Liberal
|Denis Chalifoux
|align="right"|13,923   
|align="right"|41.44
|align="right"|

|-

|Socialist Democracy
|Jacques Rose
|align="right"|125
|align="right"|0.37
|align="right"|
|-

|Natural Law
|Pierre Monpetit
|align="right"|98
|align="right"|0.29
|align="right"|
|-

|Independent
|David Rovins
|align="right"|59
|align="right"|0.18
|align="right"|
|-
|}

References

External links
Information
 Elections Quebec

Election results
 Election results (National Assembly)

Maps
 2011 map (PDF)
 2001 map (Flash)
2001–2011 changes (Flash)
1992–2001 changes (Flash)
 Electoral map of Lanaudière region
 Electoral map of Laurentides region
 Quebec electoral map, 2011

Quebec provincial electoral districts
Sainte-Agathe-des-Monts